Riccia huebeneriana is a species of liverwort belonging to the family Ricciaceae.

It is native to Eurasia and Northern America.

References

Ricciaceae